Nadine is an album by George Thorogood and the Destroyers that was released in 1986. Although it was marketed as a new release, it is a repackaging on compact disc of the tracks, in a different order, from the 1979 vinyl record Better Than the Rest. The songs were Thorogood's first recordings, made in 1974.

Track listing
"Nadine" (Chuck Berry) – 4:04
"My Way" (Jerry Capehart, Eddie Cochran) – 1:59
"You're Gonna Miss Me" (Eddie "Guitar Slim" Jones) – 2:16
"Worried About My Baby" (Camps, J. Tolbert, A. Tucker) – 3:31
"Night-Time" (Michael Henderson) – 3:11
"I'm Ready" (Willie Dixon) – 2:47
"My Weakness" (M. Smith, N. Wilson) – 2:27
"Goodbye Baby" (Joe Josea, Sam Ling, Jules Taub) – 3:10
"Huckle Up Baby" (Bernard Besman, John Lee Hooker) – 2:26
"Howlin' for My Darlin'" (Willie Dixon, Howlin' Wolf) – 3:24

References

George Thorogood and the Destroyers albums
1986 albums
MCA Records albums